The New Jersey State Opera is an opera company based in Newark, New Jersey. It was established in 1964 as the Opera Theater of Westfield, and shortly after opening Alfredo Silipigni was hired as Artistic Director. The name was changed to the Opera Theatre of New Jersey in 1965, and in 1968 the company moved to Newark Symphony Hall. In 1974 it was renamed the New Jersey State Opera. The company moved to  New Jersey Performing Arts Center (NJPAC) in 1998. In 2008, Jason C. Tramm took over as Artistic Director, serving until 2012. Tramm was a protégé of Silipigni and continued his legacy, while revitalizing the company. In 2012, it relocated to the Clifton-Passaic area.

References

External links
New Jersey State Opera official site

American opera companies
Performing arts in New Jersey
Musical groups established in 1964
Culture of Newark, New Jersey
1964 establishments in New Jersey